The Man from Nowhere is a 2010 South Korean action thriller film starring Won Bin and written and directed by Lee Jeong-beom. It was South Korea's highest-grossing film in 2010 and had 6.2 million admissions. The film follows the story of a mysterious and shady man who embarks on a bloody rampage when the only person who seems to understand him is kidnapped.

The film was released in the United States and Canada on October 1, 2010. Rocky Handsome, an Indian remake starring John Abraham, was released in 2016.

Plot
Cha Tae-sik is a quiet man running a pawnshop. His only friend is a little girl, So-mi, who lives in the same neighborhood. So-mi's mother, Hyo-jeong, is a go-go dancer and opium addict. Instructed by her lover, Hyo-jeong steals a large pack of opium being sold at the bar where she works and hides it in a camera bag, which she pawns to Tae-sik for safe keeping. 

Hyo-jeong's action attracts the attention of crime lord Oh Myung-gyu, who tasks his subordinates, brothers Man-seok and Jong-seok, to retrieve the opium. Jong-seok locates Hyo-jeong, tortures her in front of So-mi, and forces her to reveal where the drugs are. His lackeys, Du-chi and Bear, go to Tae-sik's place to intimidate him, but he easily overpowers them. Realizing Tae-sik has a soft spot for So-mi, Jong-seok kidnaps her and forces him to deliver opium to Oh Myung-gyu. Man-seok informs the police, leading to them swarming Myung-gyu's property. 

Myung-gyu escapes, while Tae-sik is arrested and discovers Hyo-jeong's body, with her organs harvested, in the back of the car he used to make the delivery. Tae-sik escapes from the police station, alarming them with his display of combat skills. So-mi is exchanged for Hyo-jeong's lover.  Upon further investigation, the police officers discover he was a former covert operative for the South Korean Army Intelligence, with numerous commendations, but retired after he was wounded and his pregnant wife was killed by a hitman. Following the lead from the burner phone he received from Jong-seok, Tae-sik tracks Du-chi to a nightclub. 

As Tae-sik asks where the brothers are, Ramrowan walks in and shoots at Tae-sik, killing Du-chi in the crossfire. The two fight to a standstill and Tae-sik gets shot. Bleeding out, Tae-sik finds his former partner, who performs emergency surgery to remove the bullet. Tae-sik recovers, asks his partner to help him acquire a gun, then goes back to the city. Tae-sik finds and frees several child slaves in a drug manufacturing plant, in the process killing off Jong-seok. He tracks down the elder brother, Man-seok, at the gang's condo, where a dozen gang members and Ramrowan are also waiting. 

Man-seok says that he has had So-mi killed and shows Tae-sik a container that has what he says are her eyes.  He demands to know what happened to his younger brother. Enraged, Tae-sik kills the gang members, including Ramrowan and Man-seok. As Tae-sik prepares to commit suicide out of grief a scared, dirty, but unscathed So-mi emerges from the darkness; she'd been saved by Ramrowan, who took pity on her because she had been kind to him - the eyes in the container belonged to the gangsters' surgeon, who had been killed off-camera by Ramrowan. The police allow Tae-sik and So-mi to ride together after Tae-sik's arrest. 

While So-mi sleeps, Tae-sik asks them to drop at a small convenience store where he buys a backpack along with other school supplies.  He tells So-mi that she's going to be on her own, as the police have to take him away. Before he goes, he asks her for a hug and breaks down in tears as they embrace.

Cast

Won Bin as Cha Tae-sik
Kim Sae-ron as So-mi
Kim Hee-won as Man-seok
Kim Sung-oh as Jong-seok, Man-Seok's brother
Kim Tae-hoon as Detective Kim Chi-gon
Thanayong Wongtrakunl as Lum Ramrowan
Lee Do-gyeom as Child at workplace
Kim Hyo-seo as Hyo-jeong, So-mi's mother
Lee Jong-yi as Detective No
Song Young-chang as Oh Myung-gyu
Jo Seok-hyuon as Moon Dal-seo
Jo Jae-yoon as Jang Doo-sik
Hong So-hee as Yeon-soo
Hwang Min-ho as Nam Sung-Sik
Kwak Byung-Kyu as Detective Kim
Lee Jae-won as Du-chi

Release
During its August 6–8 opening weekend, the film recorded 712,840 admissions, taking the number 1 spot on the box office charts for five weeks straight. It had sold a total of 6,228,300 tickets when it finished its theatrical run on November 17, 2010. On October 1, 2010 CJ Entertainment gave the film a limited theatrical release to North American theaters where it grossed  in 1 theater its opening weekend. After widening the release up to 19 theaters, the film grossed  in the U.S. and Canada.

Reception
As of August 2013, six of six critics gave positive reviews on Rotten Tomatoes. One of those critics, Russell Edwards of Variety, wrote, "Brutal violence dominates the dynamic Korean thriller The Man From Nowhere. Local heartthrob Won Bin (Mother, Tae Guk Gui) transforms himself into an action hero in writer-helmer Lee Jeong-beom’s swift and blood-soaked yarn, about a mystery man who gets caught up in a gang war while trying to protect a child, recalling Luc Besson's The Professional."

Awards

2010: (19th) Buil Film Awards – October 8
Best Music: Shim Hyun-jung
Special Award (Buil Independence Judge): The Man from Nowhere
2010 (19th) Philadelphia Film Festival – October 14–24
"Graveyard Shift Special Mention": The Man from Nowhere
2010: (47th) Grand Bell Awards – October 29
Best Actor: Won Bin
Popularity Award: Won Bin
Best Editing: Kim Sang-bum, Kim Jae-bum
Best Visual Effects: Kim Tae-ui
2010: (8th) Korean Film Awards – November 18
Best Actor: Won Bin
Best New Actress: Kim Sae-ron
Best Cinematography: Lee Tae-yoon
Best Lighting: Lee Cheol-oh
Best Editing: Kim Sang-bum, Kim Jae-bum
Best Visual Effects: Park Jung-ryul (for action scenes)
Best Music: Shim Hyun-jung
2010: (31st) Blue Dragon Film Awards – November 26
Technical Award: Park Jung-ryul (for action scenes)
Popularity Award: Won Bin
Box Office Award: The Man from Nowhere
2010: (2nd) Korean Wave Industry Awards – December 4
Popular Culture Award (Film section): The Man from Nowhere
2010: (6th) University Film Festival of Korea – December 13
Best Director: Lee Jeong-beom
Best Actor: Won Bin
Best Cinematography: Lee Tae-yoon
Best Music: Shim Hyun-jung
2010: (13th) Director's Cut Awards – December 17
Best Production: Opus Pictures (Lee Tae-heon) The Man from Nowhere
2010: (11th) National Assembly Society of Popular Culture & Media Awards (Korea) – December 20
Movie of the Year: The Man from Nowhere
2011: (2nd) Film Journalists Association Annual Film Awards (Korea) – January 27
Best Actor: Won Bin
2011: (8th) MaxMovie Awards – February 1
Best Director: Lee Jeong-beom
Best Actor: Won Bin
Best New Actress: Kim Sae-ron
2011: (3rd) Beaune International Thriller Film Festival – March 30 – April 3
Grand Prize: The Man from Nowhere
2011: (47th) Baeksang Arts Awards – May 26
Best Film: The Man from Nowhere
2011: (33rd) Golden Cinematography Awards – September 1
Gold Medal Cinematography: Lee Tae-yoon

Soundtrack

Soundtrack list:

The Man From Nowhere
In Tae - Sik s Memory
Trash Can
Mother In Danger
Chasing Her
Chain Of Mystery
Fights In Golf Club
Finding Clue
Dark Knight
Somi in Danger
Surviving Today
Agent. Tae - Sik
Dirty Cash - Mystery
His Path Of Life
There's No One But You
Shave Himself
Delivering Drug
Jump Off
Spit - Mystery
The Last Bullet
Ajussi
Dear - Mad Soul Child

Remake
In March 2012, Dimension Films acquired the rights to do an English-language remake of The Man From Nowhere; plans are to have Shawn Christensen, who wrote and directed the 2012 short film Curfew, write the adaptation. On August 5, 2020, it was reported that the remake will be produced by John Wick director Chad Stahelski and Jason Spitz with a script provided by Derek Kolstad for New Line Cinema.

An Indian remake titled Rocky Handsome, directed by Nishikant Kamat and starring John Abraham was released in March 2016.

References

External links
 

 

The Man from Nowhere at Naver 

2010 action thriller films
2010s chase films
2010 martial arts films
2010 films
South Korean action thriller films
South Korean chase films
South Korean martial arts films
South Korean neo-noir films
Films about organized crime in South Korea
Films about organ trafficking
Films about drugs
Films set in Seoul
Films directed by Lee Jeong-beom
CJ Entertainment films
2010s Korean-language films
South Korean films about revenge
2010s South Korean films